Atakhebasken (Akhetbasaken)  was a Nubian queen dated to the Twenty-fifth Dynasty of Egypt. She was the Great Royal Wife of Pharaoh Taharqa.

Burial
Atakhebasken is mainly known from her tomb in Nuri (Nu. 36). The finds from the tomb include: a shawabti, canopic jars, which are now in Boston, and an altar now in the Meroe Museum in Khartoum. Her tomb was enlarged after the chapel had already been built.

References

7th-century BC Egyptian women
Queens consort of the Twenty-fifth Dynasty of Egypt
Taharqa
7th-century BC Egyptian people